Below are the squads for the women's football tournament at the 2010 Asian Games, played in Guangzhou, China.

Group A

China PR
Coach: Li Xiaopeng

South Korea
Coach: Choi In-cheul

Vietnam
Coach:  Chen Yunfa

Jordan
Coach:  Hesterine de Reus

Group B

Japan
Coach: Norio Sasaki

North Korea
Coach: Kim Kwang-min

Thailand
Coach: Jatuporn Pramualban

References

External links
2010 Asian Games Official Website 

Women
2010